Slobodan Rajčević (born 28 February 1985) in Zrenjanin in Serbia, is a Serbian futsal player who plays for Al Mayadeen Futsal Team and the Serbia national futsal team.

References

External links
UEFA profile

1985 births
Living people
Futsal defenders
Serbian men's futsal players
Sportspeople from Zrenjanin